Clathromangelia is a genus of sea snails, marine gastropod mollusks in the family Raphitomidae .

The species in this genus lack a radula.

Species
Species within the genus Clathromangelia include:
 Clathromangelia coffea Kuroda, Habe & Oyama, 1971
 † Clathromangelia fenestrata (Millet, 1865) 
 Clathromangelia fuscoligata (Dall, 1871)
 Clathromangelia granum (Philippi, 1844)
 † Clathromangelia libyca (Cuvillier, 1933)
 Clathromangelia loiselieri Oberling, 1970
  † Clathromangelia quadrillum (Dujardin, 1837) 
 Clathromangelia rhyssa (Dall, 1919)
 Clathromangelia strigilata (Pallary, 1904)
 Clathromangelia variegata (Carpenter, 1864)
 Species brought into synonymy 
 Clathromangelia delosensis (Reeve, 1846): synonym of Clathromangelia granum (Philippi, 1844)
 Clathromangelia fehri van Aartsen & Zenetou, 1987: synonym of  Clathromangelia loiselieri Oberling, 1970
 Clathromangelia pellucida (Reeve, 1846): synonym of Citharomangelia pellucida (Reeve, 1846)

References

 Monterosato T. A. (di) (1884). Nomenclatura generica e specifica di alcune conchiglie mediterranee. Palermo, Virzi, 152 pp
 Oliverio M. (1995). The systematics of the radula-less gastropod Clathromangelia (Caenogastropoda, Conoidea). Zoologica Scripta 24(3): 193-201
 Gofas, S.; Le Renard, J.; Bouchet, P. (2001). Mollusca, in: Costello, M.J. et al. (Ed.) (2001). European register of marine species: a check-list of the marine species in Europe and a bibliography of guides to their identification. Collection Patrimoines Naturels, 50: pp. 180–213

External links
  Bouchet P., Kantor Yu.I., Sysoev A. & Puillandre N. (2011) A new operational classification of the Conoidea. Journal of Molluscan Studies 77: 273-308